In Slovakia, each day of the year corresponds to a personal name (the original list was the Roman Catholic calendar of saints). People celebrate their name days on the date corresponding to their own given names. Slovak culture has accorded similar importance to a person's name day to his or her  birthday.

The list of the names assigned to the corresponding date is normally published in the calendar. However, there are only one or two names listed in the calendar, even if more names are assigned to a date. The names in bold are listed in the calendar, the others are not. Children in Slovakia usually have names from this list. The most notable exceptions are the names in minority languages (such as Hungarian names) or a foreign name.

January

 
 Alexandra, Ábel, Makar, Karina, Kara, Kasandra, Sanda, Sandra, Saša, Senda
 Daniela, Danila, Danuta, Genovéva, Radmila
 Drahoľub, Drahomil, Drahoň, Drahoslav, Drahoš, Duchoslav, León, Títus, Drahoľuba, Drahomila, Duchoslava, Leóna, Leónia
 Artúr, Andrea
 Melchior, Melichar, Menhaden  Antónia
 Atila, Lucián, Bohuna, Bohuslava, Boleslava, Božislava, Luciána
 Čestmír, Pravomil, Severín, Čestmíra, Pravomila, Severína
 Alex, Alexej, Domoľub, Julián, Pravoľub, Vladan, Vladen, Alexia, Pravoľuba, Vladana, Vladena
 Agatón, Dalimil, Dalimír, Dalimila, Dalimíra, Daša
 Honorát, Tasilo, Honoráta, Malvína
 Arkád, Arnošt, Ernest, Arkádia, Arnoštka, Erna, Ernestína
 Čistomil, Čistoslav, Rastic, Rastimír, Rastislav, Ratislav, Vidor, Čistomila, Čistoslava, Rastislava, Ratislava, Shane
 Hilár, Radovan, Uriáš, Uriel, Hilária, Radovana,
 Dobroslav, Dobrotín, Domoslav, Loránt, Múdroslav, Domoslava,
 Kristína
 Antal, Nataša
 Priskus, Bohdana, Piroška, Priska
 Mário, Márius, Drahomíra, Dúbravka, Sára,
 Dalibor, Fabián, Fábius, Sebastián, Šebastián, Fábia, Fabiána, Fabiola, Sebastiána,
 Vincent, Vincencia
 Zora, Dorián, Sírius, Slavoľub, Slavomil, Zoran, Auróra, Cyntia, Doriána, Sinda, Slavomila, Zorana
 Miloš, Miloň, Selma,
 Timotej, Ctiboh, Timotea,
 Gejza, Saul, Šavol,
 Tamara, Polykarp, Slavibor, Slavislav, Slaviboj, Slavoboj, Svätoboj, Svätobor, Xenofón, Žarko, Polykarpa,
 Bohuš, Pribislav, Pribiš,
 Alfonz, Manfréd, Alfonzia,
 Gašpar, Pribina
 Ema, Jasna
 Emil, Emilián, Emiliána

February
 Hynek, Trifon, Táňa, Tatiana
 Erik, Aida, Erika
 Blažej, Celerín, Celerína
 Nika, Verena, Verona, Veronika
 Moderát, Modest, Agáta, Leda, Moderáta, Modesta
 Dorisa, Dorota, Titanila
 Romuald, Vanda
 Aranka, Zoja
 Rainold, Rinaldo, Zdenko, Zdeno, Apolena, Apoliena, Apolónia
 Gabriela, Omar, Várun, Scholastika, Školastika
 Dezider, Želislav, Dezidera, Želislava
 Ron, Ronald, Zoro, Zoroslav, Eulália, Perla, Slavena, Solveiga, Zoroslava
 Arpád, Jordán, Jordána
 Valentín, Velimír
 Faust, Pravoslav, Faustína, Georgia, Georgína, Pravoslava
 Pamfil, Ida, Liana, Pamfília
 Flavián, Flávius, Silván, Silvín, Flávia, Milomíra, Miloslava, Miluša, Silvána
 Jaromír, Simeon, Jaromíra, Konkordia
 Konrád, Kurt, Vlasta
 Aladár, Lívio, Lívius, Udo, Ulrich, Alma, Lívia, Ulrika, Ulriška
 Eleonóra
 Etela
 Roman, Romana, Romina
 Goran, Matej, Jazmína, Mateja, Matias
 Frederik, Taras, Federika, Frederika
 Viktor, Porfýr
 Alexander, Leander, Sandro, Skender, Drahotína, Dražica, Leandra
 Elemír, Elo, Lumír, Zlata, Zlatica
 Radomír, Radomíra

March
 Albín
 Anežka
 Bohumil, Bohumila, Ticián, Ginda, Kunigunda, Ticiána
 Gerazim, Kazimír, Romeo, Jadrana, Kazimíra
 Fridrich, Lucius, Teofil, Friderika, Teofila
 Fridolín, Koriolán, Radislav, Radoslav, Radovan, Felícia, Fridolína, Radislava, Radoslava
 Tomáš, Tomislav, Tomáška, Tomislava
 Alan, Alana
 Erhard, Františka
 Branislav, Bratislav, Bronislav, Bruno, Bratislava
 Angel, Volfram, Angela, Angelika, Algelína, Jurina
 Gregor, Teofan, Gregora, Gregoria, Gregorína
 Vlastimil, Kira, Rozína
 Matilda, Metaneta
 Agap, Belomír, Rodan, Roderich, Roderik, Torkvát, Agapa, Agapia, Rodana, Roderika, Svetlana
 Amos, Bolemír, Boleslav, Heribert, Bolemíra
 Ľuban, Ľuben, Zbignev, Zbyšek, Ľuba, Ľubica
 Ctislav, Eduard, Salvátor, Ctislava, Eduarda
 Jozef, Sibyla
 Klaudián, Klaudín, Klaudio, Klaudius, Víťazoslav, Víťazoslava
 Blahoboj, Blahosej, Blahoslav, Radek, Radko
 Beňadik, Benedikt, Oktavián, Oktávius, Benedikta, Benilda, Benita, Izolda, Oktávia
 Adrián, Apián, Dárius, Viktorián, Apia
 Gabriel
 Humbert, Marián, Anunciáta, Irida, Irisa
 Eman, Emanuel, Manuel, Emanuela, Manuela
 Rupert, Ruprecht, Alena', Dita
 Ilarion, Soňa
 Miroslav, Mieroslav, Bertold, Bertolda, Mieroslava
 Vieroľub, Vieromil, Vieroslav, Vieroslava
 Benjamín, Kvído, Balbína

April
 Hugo, Hugolín
 Zita, Áron
 Richard, Richarda
 Izidor, Izidora
 Miroslava, Mira
 Irena, Irína, Celestín, Ruben, Sixtus, Celestína, Venuša
 Zoltán, Armand, Herman, Rufínus, Rúfus, Armanda, Rufína, Rumjana
 Albert, Albertín, Albrecht, Valter, Alberta, Albertína, Albrechta
 Milena, Erhard, Mileva
 Igor, Ezechiel, Ivar, Ivor, Radomil, Igora, Radomila
 Július, Antip, Ariel, Leo, Lev, Ariela, Arleta
 Estera, Aster, Davorín, Zenon, Astéria
 Aleš, Artem, Artemon, Artemia, Artemida, Norma
 Justína, Hrdoslav, Hrdoš, Justín, Davorína, Hrdoslava, Justa
 Fedor, Fedora
 Dana, Danica
 Rudolf, Ralf, Rolf, Rudolfa, Rudolfína
 Valér, Apolón, Erich, Verner, Ilma
 Jela, Krescenc, Krescencia
 Marcel, Hvezdoň
 Ervín, Abelard, Adelard, Anzelm, Žitoslav, Anzelma, Ervína, Saskia, Žitoslava
 Slavomír, Slávo, Tvrdomír, Jelena, Noema
 Vojtech, Amand, Dimitrij, Evarist, Amanda, Demetria
 Juraj, Džuroe, Adalbert, Roger, Adalberta, Vojtecha, Vojteška
 
 Marek, Mayjoe, Izmael, Marko, Markus
 Jaroslava
 Jaroslav, Aristid, Tulius, Aristída, Tulia
 Jarmila, Prudencius, Prudencia
 Lea, Timon
 Anastázia, Anastáz, Blahomil, Asia, Blahomila, Nasťa, Nastasia

May
 Maysa , Amarila, Pamela
 Žigmund, Atanáz, Atanázia, Aténa
 Galina, Horác, Desana, Halina, Timea
 Florián, Flór, Aglája, Floriána, Florína, Pelagia
 Lesana, Gothard, Pius, Lesia, Pia, Toska
 Hermína, Ovídius, Radivoj, Tankréd, Elfrída, Frída, Herina, Mineta
 Monika, Napoleon, Stanimír, Mona
 Ingrida, Ina, Inga
 Roland, Rolanda
 Viktória, Armín, Armína, Beatrica
 Blažena, Miranda, Svatava
 Pankrác, Achiles
 Servác, Chraniboj, Chranibor, Charnislav, Servián, Chranislava, Imelda, Konzuela
 Bonifác
 Žofia, Brenda, Raisa, Sofia, Zosia
 Svetozár, Peregrín, Peregrína
 Gizela, Andronik, Ditmar, Paskal, Andronika, Paskália
 Viola
 Gertrúda, Gerda
 Bernard, Bernardín, Hviezdoslav, Bernadeta, Bernarda, Bernardína, Hviezdoslava
 Zina, Dobromír, Hostimil, Hostirad, Hostislav, Hostisvit, Teobald, Dobromíra, Hostimila, Hostislava
 Júlia, Juliána, Liana, Rita
 Želmíra, Želimír, Želmír
 Ela, Ella
 Urban, Vselovod, Vševlad, Vanesa
 Dušan
 Iveta, Vadim, Valdemar, Valdemara
 Viliam, Vilhelm, Elektra, Elma, Vilhelmína
 Vilma, Elmar, Maxim, Maxima
 Ferdinand, Neander, Ferdinanda
 Petrana, Petronela, Petrónius, Blahoslav, Nela, Petrónia

June
 Žaneta
 Oxana, Xénia, Erazim, Erazmus, Jaromil, Vlastimila
 Karolína, Kevin, Lino, Linus, Palmíro, Kaja, Klotilda, Lina, Lineta, Palmíra
 Lenka, Lena
 Laura, Dorotej, Fatima, Laurencia, Loreta, Loriána, Lara
 Norbert, Norman, Romulus, Adolfína, Norberta, Perzida
 Róbert, Borislav, Robin, Teodot, Dalma, Oriána, Róberta, Robina
 Medard
 Stanislava, Felicián, Prímus, Vojeslav, Berenika, Vojeslava
 Margaréta, Gréta
 Dobroslava, Barnabáš, Dobrava, Dobrota, Dobrotína, Flóra, Pavoslava
 Zlatko, Svätoslav, Svetislav, Svetoslav, Zlatan, Zlatomír, Zlatoň, Zlatoš, Svätoslava, Svetislava, Svetoslava, Zlatana, Zlatomíra
 Anton, Genadij, Tobiáš,
 Vasil, Bazil, Elizej, Kvintilián, Kvintín, Kvintus, Herta, Kvinta, Kvintiliána
 Vít, Jolana
 Bianka, Blanka, Benon, Božetech, Alina, Božetecha
 Adolf, Adolfína
 Vratislav, Leontín, Milovan, Milovín, Sedrik, Leontína, Milovana
 Alfréd, Leonid, Leonídas, Leoš, Ruslan, Alfréda
 Valéria, Florencián, Florentín, Silver, Florencia, Florentína
 Alojz, Elvis, Lejla
 Paulína, Achác, Eberhard, Paulín, Paula, Rozvita, Zaira
 Sidónia, Sidón
 Ján, Janis, Jaško, Jens, Johan, Jovan, Nino, Sean
 Tadeáš, Olívia, Olívius, Prosper, Febrónia, Oliva
 Adriána, Stojan, Adriena, Ria, Riana, Stojana
 Ladislav, Ladislava,
 Beáta, Beátus, Slavoj, Bea
 Pavol, Peter, Petra, Pavel, Pavla, Petula
 Melánia, Vlastibor, Vlastimír, Šárka, Vlastimíra

July
 Diana, Dean, Dejan, Dina, Zian, Dajana, Deana, Kalina, Tabita, Tajana
 Berta, Bertín, Bertína
 Miloslav, Irenej, Miliduch, Milomír, Milorad, Radimír, Rodimír, Radimíra
 Prokop, Procius, Prokopa
 Cyril, Metod, Cyrus, Cyrila
 Patrik, Patrícia, Patrokles
 Oliver, Donald, Kastor, Veleslav, Velislav, Valibals, Veleslava, Velislava
 Ivan, Ivo, Kilián, Perikles
 Lujza, Lukrécius, Lizelota, Lukrécia
 Amália, Amína, Lada
 Milota, Milutín
 Nina, Fortunát, Fortunáta
 Margita, Arne, Borivoj, Merkéta
 Kamil
 Henrich, Egon, Enrik, Enriko, Henrik, Henrika, Lota, Šarlota
 Drahomír, Karmela, Karmen, Karmena, Rút, Rúta
 Bohuslav, Božislav, Svorad
 Kamila
 Dušana
 Eliáš, Iľja, Ilia, Eliána, Iliana
 Daniel, Dan, Dalina
 Magdaléna, Magda, Mahuliena, Majda
 Oľga, Apolinár, Libérius, Libor, Liborius, Apolinára, Libora
 Vladimír, Kinga
 Jakub, Žakelína, Jamie
 Anna, Hana, Aneta, Anica, Anita, Annamária, Naneta
 Božena, Gorazd, Pantaleon
 Krištof, Innocent, Svätomír, Svätoš, Inocencia, Nausika, Svätomíra
 Marta, Olaf, Serafín, Serafa, Serafína
 Libuša, Abdon, Ingemar, Ingeborga, Ľubuša, Rowena
 Ignác, Ignát, Vatroslav, Ignácia

August
 Božidara, Božidar, Ľudomír, Božica, Kleopatra, Ľudomíra, Penelopa, Gábor
 Gustáv, Gustáva
 Jerguš, Nikodém, Nikodéma
 Dominik, Dominika, Krasoslav, Rainer, Krasoslava
 Hortenzia, Hortenz, Milivoj, Osvald, Snežana
 Jozefína, Nehoslav, Jozefa
 Štefánia, Kajetán, Afra, Afrodita, Kajetána, Štefana
 Oskár, Donát, Hartvig, Virgín, Donáta, Virgínia
 Ľubomíra, Rastic
 Vavrinec, Lars
 Zuzana, Trojan, Dulcia, Dulcinela, Dulcínia
 Darina, Dárius, Dária
 Ľubomír, Hypolit, Kasián, Kasius, Belinda
 Mojmír, Eusébius, Mojtech, Eusébia
 Marcela
 Leonard, Jáchim, Joachim, Linhart, Rochus, Leonarda
 Milica, Bertram, Bertrand, Hyacint, Libert, Mirón, Hyacinta
 Elena, Helena, Ilona
 Lýdia, Vratislava
 Anabela, Arabela
 Jana, Janka, Johana, Jovana
 Tichomír, Sigfríd, Tichomil, Tichomíra
 Filip, Vlastislav, Filipa, Filipína, Vlastislava
 Bartolomej, Bartolomea
 Ľudovít, Ludvig, Radim, Ľudovíta
 Samuel, Samo, Zemfír, Samuela, Tália, Zemfíra
 Silvia, Silvio, Silvius
 Augustín, August, Augusta, Augustína, Gustína
 Nikola, Nikolaj, Koleta, Nikoleta
 Ružena, Ružica
 Nora, Rajmund, Ramón, Rajmunda, Ramona

September
 Drahoslava, Egid, Egídius
 Linda, Absolón, Axel, Justus, Ermelinda, Melinda, Rebeka, Clayton
 Belo, Antim, Klélia
 Rozália, Kandid, Mojžiš, Rozalín, Rozálio, Kandida, Róza, Rozeta, Rozita, Rusalka
 Regína, Bojan, Bojimír, Bojislav, Borimír, Branimír, Chotimír, Justinián, Otakar, Regan, Regulus, Viktorín, Bojana, Bojimíra, Boislava, Branimíra, Budislava, Chotimíra, Larisa
 Alica, Brian, Magnus, Mansvét, Zachariáš, Bria
 Marianna, Miriam, Mariana
 Miriama, Miriana
 Martina, Gordan, Gordián, Gordon, Gordana, Rea, Tina
 Oleg, Honór, Vitold, Honóra, Krasava, Vitolda
 Bystrík, Prótus, Zdislav, Helga, Zdislava
 Mária, Maja, Manon, Manona, Marica, Mariela, Marieta, Marika, Marila, Mariola, Marlena, Marusia
 Ctibor, Amát, Amátus, Stibor, Sven, Amáta
 Ľudomil, Dragan, Dragutín, Drahan, Drahotín, Ľudomila, Radka, Serena
 Jolana, Melisa, Melita
 Ľudmila, Duňa
 Olympia, Lambert, Záviš
 Eugénia, Ariadna
 Konštantín, Trofín, Konstancia, Konštantína
 Ľuboslav, Ľuboslava, Eustach, Filibert, Liboslav, Eustachia, Liboslava
 Matúš, Ifigénia, Mirela
 Móric, Maurícius, Maurus
 Zdenka, Polyxénia, Tekla, Zdena
 Ľubor, Ľuboš, Terenc
 Vladislav, Vladivoj, Eufrozina, Fruzína, Vladislava
 Edita, Edina
 Cyprián, Damián, Kozmas, Damiána, Mirabela
 Václav, Chariton, Kariton, Václava
 Michal, Michaela, Michael, Michala
 Jarolím, Hieronym, Jeremiáš, Jarolíma, Ráchel, Ráchela, Una

October
 Arnold, Remig, Remus, Arnolda, Belina
 Levoslav, Leodegar, Levoslava, Dugo
 Stela, Amadeus, Evald, Amadea
 František, Edvin, Fraňo
 Viera, Blahomír, Placid, Blahomíra, Karitína, Placida, Winfred
 Natália
 Eliška
 Brigita, Brit, Brita
 Dionýz, Dionýzia
 Slavomíra, Gedeon, Záboj, Krasomila
 Valentína, Belín, Zvonimír, Zvonislav, Bruna, Brunhilda, Luneta, Selena, Zvonimíra, Zvonislava
 Maximilián, Max, Maximiliána
 Koloman, Edgar
 Boris, Borislav, Kalist, Borislava, Kalista
 Terézia, Tereza
 Vladimíra, Gál, Havel, Havla
 Hedviga, Jadviga
 Lukáš
 Kristián, Christián, Izák, Christiána, Kristiána
 Vendelín, Eunika, Vendelína
 Uršuľa, Anatol, Anatólia, Antília
 Sergej, Dobromil, Sergius, Zdravomil, Kordula, Korduľa, Pribislava, Saloma, Saloména, Solomia
 Alojzia, Žitomír
 Kvetoslava, Aretas, Cvetan, Gilbert, Harold, Herald, Krasomil, Kvetoň, Kvetoslav, Rafael, Šalamún, Areta, Cvetana, Gilberta, Kveta, Kvetana, Kvetava, Rafaela
 Aurel, Krišpín, Vojmír, Zosim, Živan, Živko, Dália, Vojmíra, Živa, Živana
 Demeter, Amand, Dimitrij, Evarist, Amanda, Demetria
 Sabína, Horislav, Hromislav, Horislava, Hromislava, Sabrina, Zoa, Zoana
 Dobromila, Júda, Judáš
 Klára, Narcis, Zenob, Klarisa, Narcisa, Zenóbia
 Šimon, Simona, Arzen, Asen, Simon, Asena, Simoneta, Šimona
 Aurélia, Stacho, Volfgang

November
 Denis, Denisa
 Cézar, Cezária
 Hubert
 Karol, Džesika, Jesika, Karola, Skarleta
 Imrich, Emerich, Imriška
 Renáta, Renát, Renáto, Renátus
 René, Engelbert
 Bohumír, Bohumíra
 Teodor, Orest, Teo, Teodorik, Teodoz, Deodata, Tea, Teodora, Teodózia
 Tibor, Tiber, Meluzína, Tibora
 Martin, Martinián, Marrow, Maroš
 Svätopluk, Astrid, Jonáš, Astrida
 Stanislav
 Irma, Juventín, Mladen, Mladoň, Mladotín, Ima, Juventína, Mladena, Mladotína
 Leopold, Leopolda, Leopoldína
 Agnesa, Otmar, Agneša, Inéza
 Klaudia, Klodeta
 Eugen, Platón
 Alžbeta, Betina, Elizabeta, Lila, Liliana, Líza
 Félix, Filemon, Homér
 Elvíra, Ctirad, Ctirada
 Cecília, Cecilián, Šejla
 Klement, Klementín, Kliment, Kolumbín, Klementína, Kolumbína
 Emília, Milín, Milina
 Katarína, Katrina
 Kornel, Valerián, Brandon
 Milan, Nestor, Virgil, Milana
 Henrieta, Gerhard, Tristan, Desdemona, Eta
 Vratko, Saturnín, Zaida
 Ondrej, Andrej, Andreas

December
 Edmund, Edmunda, Elza
 Bibiána, Budimír, Budislav, Budimíra, Viviána
 Oldrich, Sofron, Xavér, Sofrónia, Xavéria
 Barbora, Babeta, Barbara, Barica
 Oto, Gerald, Otakar, Otokar, Geralda, Geraldína, Jitka, Ota, Sáva
 Mikuláš, Nikita, Niko, Nikolas, Nikoleta, Mikuláška
 Ambróz, Amarant, Amaranta, Ambrózia
 Marina
 Izabela, Dalila, Leokádia
 Radúz, Herbert
 Hilda, Hildegard, Hildegarda
 Otília, Spiridon, Dília, Odeta
 Lucia, Rosan, Rosana, Roxana
 Branislava, Bronislava, Broňa
 Ivica, Detrich, Radan, Radana
 Albína, Bela, Teofánia
 Kornélia, Lazár, Kora, Korina
 Sláva, Gracián, Grácia, Graciána, Slavislava
 Judita, Abrahám, Mstislav, Neméz, Ita, Mstislava, Neméza
 Dagmara, Dag, Dagobert, Daga, Damara
 Bohdan
 Adela, Ada, Adelaida, Adelgunda, Adelína, Adina, Alida
 Nadežda, Naďa
 Adam, Eva, Evamária, Evelína, Gaja, Gajana, Geja
 
 Štefan
 Filoména, Filomén
 Ivana, Ivona, Iva
 Milada, Jonatán, Miladín, Nátan, Natanel
 Dávid, Lotar
 Silvester, Horst

See also
 Name day

References

Slovakia
Festivals in Slovakia
Slovak culture